Thiotrisescaline (T-TRIS) is a series of lesser-known phenethylamines prepared as potential psychedelic drugs.  There are two isomers, 3-T-TRIS and 4-T-TRIS, each similar in structure to trisescaline with a sulfur atom in a place of a different oxygen atom. They were first synthesized by Alexander Shulgin and described in his book PiHKAL.  Very little is known about their dangers or toxicity.

T-TRIS compounds

See also 
 Mescaline
 Trisescaline

References 

Phenethylamines
Phenol ethers
Thioethers